H2O: Mermaid Adventures is an animated Netflix original programme for children. It is based on the Australian teenage show H2O: Just Add Water created by Jonathan M. Shiff. The series is produced by Denis Olivieri and directed by Tian Xiao Zhang. A 13-episode first series was released to Netflix on 22 May 2015. The second series was released on Netflix on 15 July 2015.

Characters

Main
Rikki Chadwick, who is the rebel of the group, and close friend of Emma and Cleo. After becoming a mermaid, Rikki gains the ability to boil water. She is voiced by Holly Gauthier-Frankel.
Emma Gilbert, who is the more reasonable, and responsible among her friends at times, and former synchronized swimmer. After becoming a mermaid, Emma gains the ability to freeze water. She is voiced by Eleanor Noble.
Cleo Sertori, who is a shy girl that is very interested in studying marine biology. After becoming a mermaid, Cleo gains the ability to control water. She has romantic feelings for Lewis. She is voiced by Sonja Ball.
Lewis McCartney, a tech-savvy young man who is close friends with the girls, and has a crush on Cleo. He helps the girls out on their adventures, from distraction to technical support. He is voiced by Daniel Brochu.
Bernie the Hermit Crab, a hermit crab who was saved by Cleo in the first episode. After the girls become mermaids, Bernie is able to talk with them, and regularly calls upon the girls to help him when there's trouble in the ocean. He is voiced by Bruce Dinsmore.

Recurring
Zane Bennett, who is a troublemaker at times and has a shaky romance with Rikki.
Miriam Kent, the spoiled daughter of Dolphin City's mayor, who causes trouble for the girls.
The "Vandal Gang", a group of troublemakers: Murray the moray eel, Danny the octopus, and Burke, a hammerhead shark. They typically cause trouble for the denizens in the bay area.

Episodes

Season 1 (2015)
 "The Secret of Mako Island" – 22 May 2015
 "Caught in the Net" – 22 May 2015
 "The White Mermaid" – 22 May 2015
 "A Stormy Party" – 22 May 2015
 "Mako Island Hotel" – 22 May 2015
 "The Mysterious Seaweed" – 22 May 2015
 "It's in the Bag!" – 22 May 2015
 "Dolphin City Triangle" – 22 May 2015
 "Poseidon's Daughter" – 22 May 2015
 "Dolphin City Mascot" – 22 May 2015
 "Bad Waves" – 22 May 2015
 "Jaws-ache!" – 22 May 2015
 "The Lost Ring" – 22 May 2015

Season 2 (2015)
 "Reported Missing" – 15 July 2015
 "Memory Lapse" – 15 July 2015
 "Valentine's Day" – 15 July 2015
 "Kidnapped!" – 15 July 2015
 "A Strange Phenomenon" – 15 July 2015
 "Handle with Care" – 15 July 2015
 "The Return of the White Mermaid" – 15 July 2015
 "Three Days Underwater" – 15 July 2015
 "Robot Duel" – 15 July 2015
 "The Creature from the Bay" – 15 July 2015
 "Underwater Takeover" – 15 July 2015
 "Imminent Danger" – 15 July 2015
 "Trapped" – 15 July 2015

See also
 Mermaids in popular culture

References

External links
 
 H2O: Mermaid Adventures by ZDF Enterprises
 Media kit by ZDF Enterprises

H2O: Just Add Water
2010s Australian animated television series
2015 Australian television series debuts
2015 Australian television series endings
Anime-influenced Western animated television series
Australian children's animated fantasy television series
Australian flash animated television series
Australian television spin-offs
English-language television shows
Fiction about mermaids
Fictional mermen and mermaids
Mermaids in television
Television series about shapeshifting